Irenia is a genus of moths in the family Oecophoridae.

Species
Irenia curvula Clarke, 1978
Irenia leucoxantha Clarke, 1978

References

Oecophorinae
Moth genera